Alexander Staveley Hill  (21 May 1825 – 25 June 1905) was a Conservative Party politician in the United Kingdom. He was a Member of Parliament (MP) from 1868 to 1900, representing Coventry, Staffordshire West and Kingswinford.

Hill was born in Wolverhampton, the son of Henry Hill, a banker, and his wife Anne Staveley. Educated at King Edward's School, Birmingham. Having become a barrister and QC, Hill represented Coventry from 1868 to 1874, West Staffordshire from 1874 to 1885 and Kingswinford from 1885 to 1900. He also served as Judge Advocate of the Fleet.

He lived at Kensington and at Oxley Manor, Bushbury, Staffordshire, where he was a JP and Deputy Lieutenant of the county. In 1880 he and his wife funded a school and chapel at Bushbury.

During the years 1881-1884 Hill went on annual visits to western Canada and published an account of his travels, From Home to Home: Autumn Wanderings in the Northwest in the Years 1881-1884 (1885). The town of Stavely, Alberta was named after him.

He married Katherine Ponsonby and they had a son, Henry Staveley-Hill, who followed his father into the law and politics. After Katherine died Hill married again, to Mary Frances Baird, daughter of Francis Baird of St Petersburg.

External links 
 
 Alexander Staveley Hill (1825-1905), Barrister and politician at the National Portrait Gallery

1825 births
1905 deaths
People from Wolverhampton
Deputy Lieutenants of Staffordshire
Conservative Party (UK) MPs for English constituencies
Members of the Privy Council of the United Kingdom
English justices of the peace
UK MPs 1868–1874
UK MPs 1874–1880
UK MPs 1880–1885
UK MPs 1885–1886
UK MPs 1886–1892
UK MPs 1892–1895
UK MPs 1895–1900
Members of Parliament for Coventry